Music Box is the third studio album by American singer-songwriter Mariah Carey. It was released by Columbia Records on August 31, 1993. The album comprises ballads primarily written by Carey and Walter Afanasieff, with whom she had previously worked on Emotions (1991), and a few urban dance tracks. During the course of the album's development, Carey wanted to broaden her audience, choosing a more pop/R&B oriented sound. During this time frame, she experimented with different musical instruments, leading the album's sound away from her more contemporary previous two efforts.

In order to successfully take the album in a new direction, Carey and Afanasieff sought out new and innovative producers, as well as some from Carey's previous releases. Kenneth "Babyface" Edmonds first began working with Carey on Music Box, where he helped produce "Never Forget You", as well as being part of the songwriting process. Additional writers and producers were Robert Clivillés and David Cole (a pair also known as C+C Music Factory) and Daryl Simmons. While the album featured a range of music producers, the bulk of the songwriting was done by Carey and her writing partner, Walter Afanasieff. In future projects, they would continue writing material for Carey's albums, until her 1999 release Rainbow, where he is absent from the writing credits.

Four singles were released from the album. The first three, "Dreamlover", "Hero" and "Without You", became worldwide chart-topping singles, the latter becoming Carey's highest charting international single of her career. "Without You" became Carey's first number-one single in most European markets and reached the top three in the United States. To promote Music Box, Carey embarked on the short but successful Music Box Tour which traveled to select cities in North America. Carey was nominated for Best Female Pop Vocal Performance for "Dreamlover" at the 1994 Grammy Awards and received the same nomination for "Hero" at the 1995 Grammy Awards.

After its release, Music Box received generally mixed reviews from music critics. The album faced criticism regarding Carey's more mellow and laid-back tone in comparison to her previous work. Commercially, the album reached number one in 15 countries, including Australia, France, Germany, the United Kingdom and the United States. The Recording Industry Association of America (RIAA) certified it Diamond, for shipments of ten million copies across the United States. Music Box remains Carey's highest seller with more than 28 million copies sold worldwide and is one of the best-selling albums of all time.

Background and development 

In 1988, Carey was discovered by Tommy Mottola, CEO of Columbia Records, and was promptly signed to the label. Carey's self-titled debut studio album, released in 1990, focused on re-recording and mastering several songs she had already written in high school alongside classmate, Ben Margulies. Aside from the seven songs taken from Carey's demo tape, four other tracks were written and produced by the former and an array of famed record producers. The album was complimented by critics, who called it a mature debut, full of various genre influences ranging from pop, R&B and soul. The album became a commercial success, selling fifteen million units globally. While making a strong impact on pop music, Carey became interested in altering her sound, and deviating from pop music for her second studio effort, Emotions (1991). Following the success of her debut, Columbia allowed her to take more control over her musical departure, enabling her to change her genre infusions, melodies and production.

The album was originally scheduled for release a week earlier under the title Hero.

With Carey as executive producer, having more control than she had on any other album, she took the album in a new direction, alongside Afanasieff. For Carey's third studio effort, she enrolled the help of a range of songwriters, as well as record producers. Aside from Afanasieff, Kenneth "Babyface" Edmonds, a man who would collaborate with Carey often in the near future, also took part in the project. Babyface also co-wrote a track with Carey titled "Never Forget You", a song that was released as a B-side to "Without You" exclusively in the United States. The album, which consisted mostly of slower ballads (with the exception of "Dreamlover", "Now That I Know", and "I've Been Thinking about You"), contained collaborations with some carry-on producers and writers from Emotions. Of these were Clivillés & Cole (of C+C Music Factory), who co-wrote the track "Now That I Know", a danceable pop-R&B ballad, which used similar formulas and synthesizers from tracks on Emotions. Another writer–producer that worked on the album was David Hall, who with Carey wrote the US single "Dreamlover".

During the album's recording, Carey worked with several different musicians and producers, aside from Walter Afanasieff, the only hold over from her debut. On the album's first track "Dreamlover", Carey worked with Dave Hall throughout the song's entire production. In order to help with some of the song's arrangements, Mottola enrolled the help of Walter Afanasieff, who took on the completed track and transformed it into a more commercial hit.

Music and lyrics 
Emotions contains influences from mostly 1950s, 1960s and 1970s balladry and gospel, as well as her continued work of R&B and soul. The album, while praised by some as more mature and raw, failed to reach the critical or commercial heights of her debut effort, while selling far less and failed to introduce Carey into a different market. Following these events, Columbia decided to try to market Carey in a similar fashion to her debut, only having her produce a more commercial and radio-friendly album. Their plans were to tone down Carey's vocals, and soften the album's production, leaving a more contemporary pop/R&B record. Agreeing to the change, Carey and Afanasieff began writing and recording material for her third studio effort, Music Box.

One of the noticeable differences from Music Box and Carey's previous albums is its sound. The album was described by Afanasieff as a softer and more pop-oriented album, "filling the songs with air", and allowing far more space in the overall sound. Another noticeable change is in the album's production. When Mariah Carey was released, critics took notice of its "overly produced" and "studio perfect" quality, where in comparison, Emotions maintains a "raw, live sound." Music Box however, falls in between the two, a decision made by Carey during the album's production. She would layer each track with live backing vocals, so not to sound too overly produced, but still kept the inclusion of musical synthesizers.

According to Marc Shapiro, Music Box reflects signs of Carey's vocal maturity, as well as representing an album she was truly proud of. The album's first single "Dreamlover" was described as a "slight piece of pop fluff," representing a more commercial side to Carey than the "more ambitious," "Vision of Love". Critics believed the song's chart performance was due to its summer release, as people were still looking for a "not-too-heavy" and more diverse sound. The song's composition was described as "mid tempo and mildly dance-able," with Carey's voice being called "perpetually happy," like a "little-girl voice."

Songs 

"Hero", the album's second single, was one of Carey's most inspirational ballads at the time.
The song is described as "a lush ballad", with Carey making use of her impressive, "lower alto register." As one of the more emotional tracks on the album, "Hero" builds emotion, verse through verse, where the lyrics and melody finally "broke through." "Anytime You Need a Friend" is another pop ballad in which Carey would, "let her voice roam free", a feature critics felt lacked on the album. The song featured "rough and low vocals", as well as some glimpses of Carey's upper registers. As with most of the songs on Music Box, the lyrics boast a positive message, and it is the only song on the album to feature traces of gospel-inspired vocals throughout the chorus.

The album's title track, "Music Box", is another ballad Carey wrote with Afanasieff. The song is described as one of Carey's more difficult compositions, due to its "softness". The song requires a great deal of legato to keep "the tune's softness and sweetness, without resorting to volume." Carey's vocals on the track are defined as "soft and controlled," managing to maintain the delicate balance in a manner that seems effortless, floating easily over the keyboard and the shimmer of the guitar. Lyrically, due to the song's message of "commitment and promise," and the "tinkling music-box line played on the synthesizer," the track gives the sensation of a wedding vow recital. "Never Forget You" is a slow song, further connecting it to the song's message of "lamenting the loss of love, in a very tender way." The song contains keyboard notes that hover over the verses and allow Carey to indulge in her backing vocals. It was described by Nickson as a "stand out track," one that could have easily become a hit single, "with an appeal that would have easily transcended generational barriers."

Three additional tracks from the album sessions were released, with "Do You Think of Me" serving as the B-side to "Dreamlover," "Everything Fades Away" being featured on international editions of Music Box and, 27 years later, "All I Live For" being released on The Rarities compilation album (along with "Do You Think Of Me" and "Everything Fades Away") in 2020.

Release and promotion 
Music Box was released in both the United States and the United Kingdom on August 31, 1993, followed by Japan on September 11. To promote the album, Carey embarked on her first headlining concert tour, the Music Box Tour. Due to stage fright, Carey had not toured to promote her previous albums and did not originally plan a tour to support Music Box. However, after the continued success of the album and persuasion from Tommy Mottola, Carey agreed. Because Carey did not feel physically or emotionally ready for an extensive tour, six concerts were scheduled, each with many days in between, in order to give her voice time to rest. Before the tour, she gave a performance at Proctor's Theatre on July 18, 1993, which was filmed and later released under the one-hour special Here Is Mariah Carey slated for release during the Christmas season. When tickets went on sale, the concerts did not sell out instantly but sold at a healthy pace. On the opening night, she sang at the Miami Arena. Approximately two-thirds of the venue's capacity was filled, which worried Carey's management. However, Carey did not seem to mind and began the show with high spirits. As the first show in Miami received scathing reviews; subsequent shows sold out of tickets and attracted rave reviews.

Aside from touring for the first time in her career, Carey visited various American and European television programs, performing different singles from the album. In late 1993, Carey appeared on The Arsenio Hall Show, performing both "Dreamlover" and "Hero". Other 1993 performances included "Hero" on The Jay Leno Show and "Dreamlover" on her fourth visit to Top of the Pops. Carey continued promoting the album in 1994, performing both "Without You" and "Anytime You Need a Friend" on their fifth and sixth visits to Top of the Pops, as well as visiting France, Germany, Japan, the Netherlands, Spain and Sweden. In the midst of the Music Box Tour, Carey had already begun working with Walter Afanasieff on her holiday album Merry Christmas, which was to be released during the Christmas season of 1994. Additionally, Carey and Affanasieff reportedly began experimenting with ideas and music for Carey's 1995 album Daydream.

Singles 
"Dreamlover" was released as the album's first single on July 27, 1993. The single debuted at number thirteen on the Billboard Hot 100, and due to its massive airplay, the song reached the top of the Hot 100, staying there for eight weeks. Dreamlover topped the charts in Canada, and reached the top-ten in many other countries. The song was certified Platinum by the Recording Industry Association of America (RIAA), denoting shipments of one million copies, as well as receiving a Gold certification in Australia and New Zealand. The music video for "Dreamlover" featured "summer scenery", with scenes of Carey swimming in a pool by a waterfall, lying in a bed of sunflowers, as well as singing in front of hip-hop dancers. The video tried to capture, a "home video" feel, adding to the song's subtle and airy nature, something that only helped the song dominate the charts "Hero" served as the album's second single, and was released on October 18, 1993. Music critics praised the song, calling it her most directly inspirational song since "Make It Happen". The song topped the charts in the United States and the top-five in many other major music markets. The music video for "Hero," featured footage from Carey's concert at Proctor's Theatre, as was done for Carey's following music video for "Without You".

"Without You", the album's third single, became the biggest international hit of Carey's career. "Without You" reached number three in the United States, but experienced its real success throughout Europe. The song became Carey's first number-one single in Austria, Germany, Ireland, Sweden, Switzerland and the United Kingdom, propelling the sales of Music Box throughout the world. Carey brought the song renewed popularity, through her highly successful adaptation. It became one of the "fifty most-played songs of the year" and even outsold Harry Nilsson's version, receiving many awards and recognition. "Anytime You Need a Friend", the album's final single, was released on May 24, 1994. It also experienced success on the charts, reaching number one in Finland; and the top ten in Canada, New Zealand, Iceland and the United Kingdom; as well as peaking at number twelve in the United States. It became the second single in Music Box to perform better throughout Europe than in the US.

Critical reception 

Music Box received mixed reviews from critics, many of whom found the performances uninvolved and devoid of substantial songwriting. In Rolling Stone, Stephen Holden said the lyrics were "made up entirely of pop and soul clichés" on an album "so precisely calculated to be a blockbuster that its impact is ultimately a little unnerving". Christopher John Farley from Time called it "perfunctory and almost passionless" in spite of highlights in "Anytime You Need a Friend" and the title track. In Entertainment Weekly, David Browne found Carey's performance low on energy and her voice no longer soaring above the backup chorus. Instead, he wrote in Entertainment Weekly, she "drips over them like syrup instead of overpowering them; she lets the melodies speak for themselves." Dennis Hunt was particularly critical in the Los Angeles Times, writing that Carey's pop-soul songs still lacked emotion even though she had "toned down her vocal showboating". He accused Music Box of being geared toward an adult contemporary audience that "likes its soul whitewashed and in small doses". Village Voice critic Robert Christgau labeled it a "dud", indicating "a bad record whose details rarely merit further thought".

In a retrospective review for AllMusic, Ron Wynn deemed Music Box "partly successful" and believed it was smart of Carey to explore her vocal approach differently, but she ended up sounding "detached on several selections". With the exception "Hero" and "Dreamlover", the other songs lacked her usual "personality and intensity", according to Wynn. Q was more impressed by the record, writing that "this 1993 celebration of the all-conquering power of love was her defining moment".

Accolades

Commercial performance

North America 
Music Box entered the US Billboard 200 at number two, with 174,000 copies sold, becoming Carey's fourth consecutive top-ten album in the country. In its fifteenth week after release, the album topped the chart and enjoyed its highest sales week in December, selling 295,000 copies in its first week atop, 395,000 the following week and peaking with 505,000 copies sold in year's final week. It stayed at the top for eight non-consecutive weeks.
It remained in the top ten for thirty-one weeks and on the Billboard 200 for 128 weeks (more than two years, longer than any other of her albums), re-entering the chart three times. The album also reached number one on Top R&B/Hip-Hop Albums. Music Box was the second-best selling album in the United States in 1994, only behind Ace of Base's The Sign. In the United States, Music Box became Carey's best-selling album at the time, being certified Diamond by the RIAA, denoting shipments of ten million copies. The album also became a success in Canada, peaking at number two on the charts and being certified seven-times Platinum by the Canadian Recording Industry Association (CRIA).

Other markets 
Music Box became Carey's best-seller in Europe, topping the charts in Austria, Belgium, Denmark, Finland, France, Germany, Iceland, Ireland, the Netherlands, Portugal, Scotland, Switzerland and the United Kingdom. In Germany, it became her highest-charting album, spending eighty weeks on the German Albums Chart, eleven of which were spent at number one. The album was certified double platinum by the BVMI for sales in excess of 1,400,000 million. In the United Kingdom, Music Box remains Carey's highest seller, topping the UK Albums chart for six non-consecutive weeks and being certified quintuple platinum by the British Phonographic Industry. It became a million-selling album in France, receiving a Diamond certification and topping the French Album Charts. Music Box was certified six-times platinum in the Netherlands, where it spent 12 non-consecutive weeks at number one. Music Box ended as the best-selling album of 1994 on the European Top 100 Albums, selling six million copies in Europe, moving another million copies in the region by 1995.

In Australia, the album spent 18 non-consecutive weeks at number one, and was certified 12-times platinum by the Australian Recording Industry Association (ARIA), denoting shipments of 840,000 copies. The album finished at number one on the (ARIA) 1994 End of Year Chart.

In Asia, Music Box became one of the best-selling albums of 1994, selling 2.2 million copies in Japan alone. Sony Music's marketing director Andy Yavasis claimed sales of 600,000 in South Korea, 320,000 copies in Taiwan, 110,000 in Singapore and 80,000 copies in Hong Kong by July 1994.

In Latin America, Music Box also enjoyed success, mostly due to the Spanish version of "Hero", titled "Héroe", which managed the album to sell 500,000 copies in the region.

Worldwide 
Music Box has sold over 28 million copies worldwide, and is one of the best-selling albums of all time.

Track listing 
Credits adapted from the album's liner notes

Notes
 "Without You" is a Badfinger cover (1970)

Sample credits
 "Dreamlover" contains a sample of The Emotions' "Blind Alley" (1972)
 "I've Been Thinking About You" contains a sample of Melvin Bliss' "Synthetic Substitution" (1973) and Slave's "Just a Touch of Love" (1979)

Personnel 
Credits adapted from Music Box album liner notes.

Musicians
 Mariah Carey – lead vocals, background vocals
 Walter Afanasieff – keyboards, additional keyboards, synthesizers
 Dave Hall – synthesizers, keyboards, rhythm programming
 David Cole – keyboards
 Babyface – keyboards, percussion, background vocals
 Ren Klyce – Akai and Roland programming
 Gary Cirimelli – MacIntosh and synthesizer programming
 Ricky Crespo – programming
 Shawn Lucas – programming
 James T. Alfano – programming
 Michael Landau – guitars
 Kayo – bass
 Robert Clivillés – drums, percussion
 Mark C. Rooney – background vocals
 Cindy Mizelle – background vocals
 Melonie Daniels – background vocals
 Kelly Price – background vocals
 Shanrae Price – background vocals

Production
 Mariah Carey – arranger
 Dave Hall – arranger
 Walter Afanasieff – arranger
 Robert Clivilles – arranger
 David Cole – arranger
 Babyface – arranger
 Bob Rosa – engineer, mix engineer
 David Gleeson – engineer
 Dana Jon Chappelle – engineer, vocal engineering
 Acar Key – engineer
 Frank Filipetti – engineer
 Jim Zumpano – engineer
 Jim Caruana – 2nd engineer
 Jen Monnar – 2nd engineer
 Kent Matcke – 2nd engineer
 Mark Krieg – 2nd engineer
 Kirk Yano – additional tracking engineer
 Mick Guzauski – mixing
 Bob Ludwig – mastering, Gateway Master Studios

Charts

Weekly charts

Decade-end charts

Year-end charts

All-time charts

Certifications and sales

See also 
 List of best-selling albums
 List of best-selling albums by women
 List of best-selling albums in the United States
 List of best-selling albums in Australia
 List of best-selling albums in Europe
 List of best-selling albums in France
 List of best-selling albums in Germany
 List of best-selling albums in Japan
 List of best-selling albums of the 1990s in the United Kingdom
 List of Billboard 200 number-one albums of 1993
 List of Billboard 200 number-one albums of 1994
 List of number-one R&B albums of 1993 (U.S.)
 List of top 25 albums for 1994 in Australia
 list of European number-one hits of 1994

References 

Works cited

 
 

Mariah Carey albums
1993 albums
Columbia Records albums
Albums produced by Walter Afanasieff